Günther Pfaff (12 August 1939 – 10 November 2020) was an Austrian sprint canoeist who competed from the mid-1960s to the mid-1970s. Competing in four Summer Olympics, he won a bronze in the K-2 1000 m event at Mexico City in 1968.

Pfaff also won four medals at the ICF Canoe Sprint World Championships with a gold (K-2 1000 m: 1970), two silvers (K-2 1000 m: 1971, K-4 1000 m: 1966), and a bronze (K-2 500 m: 1970).

References

External links

1943 births
2020 deaths
Austrian male canoeists
Canoeists at the 1964 Summer Olympics
Canoeists at the 1968 Summer Olympics
Canoeists at the 1972 Summer Olympics
Canoeists at the 1976 Summer Olympics
Olympic canoeists of Austria
Olympic bronze medalists for Austria
Olympic medalists in canoeing
ICF Canoe Sprint World Championships medalists in kayak
Medalists at the 1968 Summer Olympics